Consummation is an album by the Thad Jones/Mel Lewis Jazz Orchestra. It was released in 1970 on Blue Note Records and re-released in 2002. It was recorded at A&R Studios in New York City.  The album was nominated for a 1970 Grammy award in the "Best Jazz Performance - Large Group..." category.  All tracks were included in Mosaic's limited edition boxed set, The Complete Solid State Recordings of the Thad Jones/Mel Lewis Orchestra.

Reception
Richard Cook and Brian Morton gave Consummation a four-star review in The Penguin Guide to Jazz, and included it in the book's Core Collection.  Cook and Morton described the recording as "one of the best big-band records of its day and some kind of proof that the bands weren't completely dead."

Track listing 
All compositions and arrangements are by Thad Jones.
LP side A:
"Dedication" – 5:13
"It Only Happens Every Time" – 3:07
"Tiptoe" – 6:42
"A Child Is Born" – 4:09
"Us" –  3:37
LP side B:
"Ahunk Ahunk" –  7:57
"Fingers" – 10:38
"Consummation" – 5:09

Personnel 
Thad Jones – flugelhorn
Snooky Young – trumpet
Danny Moore – trumpet
Al Porcino – trumpet
Marvin Stamm – trumpet
Eddie Bert – trombone
Benny Powell – trombone
Jimmy Knepper – trombone
Cliff Heather – bass trombone
Jerome Richardson – soprano saxophone, alto saxophone, flute, alto flute
Jerry Dodgion – alto saxophone, clarinet, flute, alto flute
Billy Harper – tenor saxophone, flute
Eddie Daniels – tenor saxophone, clarinet, flute
Richie Kamuca – baritone saxophone (tracks A1, 2, 3, 5, B3), clarinet
Pepper Adams –  baritone saxophone (tracks A4, B1)
Joe Farrell  – baritone saxophone (track B2)
Roland Hanna – acoustic piano, electric piano
Richard Davis – acoustic bass, electric bass
Mel Lewis – drums
Jimmy Buffington - French horn, tracks A1, B3
Earl Chapin - French horn, tracks A1, B3
Dick Berg - French horn, tracks A1, B3
Julius Watkins - French horn, tracks A1, B3
Howard Johnson - tuba, tracks A1, B3
David Spinozza - guitar, tracks A5, B1

References

Blue Note (U.S.) BST 84346
Solid State (Japan) SR 3110
 Consummation at discogs.com

Blue Note Records albums
The Thad Jones/Mel Lewis Orchestra albums
1970 albums
Solid State Records (jazz label) albums
Albums produced by Sonny Lester